Twins is an album credited to jazz composer and saxophonist Ornette Coleman, released by Atlantic Records in 1971. The album was assembled without Coleman's input, comprising outtakes from recording sessions of 1959 to 1961 for The Shape of Jazz to Come, This Is Our Music, Free Jazz: A Collective Improvisation, and Ornette! Sessions for "Monk and the Nun" took place at Radio Recorders in Hollywood, California; for "First Take" at A&R Studios in New York City, and all others at Atlantic Studios also in Manhattan. The track "First Take" was a first attempt at "Free Jazz" from the album of the same name.

Track listing
All compositions by Ornette Coleman.

Personnel
 Ornette Coleman – alto saxophone
 Don Cherry – pocket trumpet; cornet on "Monk and the Nun"
 Charlie Haden – bass on 1959 and 1960 tracks
 Scott LaFaro – bass on "First Take" and "Check Up"
 Billy Higgins – drums on "First Take" and "Monk and the Nun"
 Ed Blackwell – drums on 1960 and 1961 tracks
 Freddie Hubbard – trumpet on "First Take"
 Eric Dolphy – bass clarinet on "First Take"

References

1961 albums
Atlantic Records albums
Ornette Coleman albums
Albums produced by Nesuhi Ertegun